The 2014 African Handball Cup Winners' Cup was the 20th edition, organized by the African Handball Confederation, under the auspices of the International Handball Federation, the international handball sport governing body. The tournament was held from May 20–29, 2014 in Oyo, Republic of the Congo, contested by 7 teams and won by Espérance Sportive de Tunis of Tunisia.

Results

Final standings

Awards

External links
 Results - cahbonline

References

African Handball Cup Winners' Cup
2014 African Handball Cup Winners' Cup